Something in the City is a 1959 British television sitcom. Aired on ITV, it was produced by Jack Hylton Productions for Associated-Rediffusion Television. Cast included Eric Barker, Joan Benham, Pearl Hackney, Diane Hart, Deryck Guyler and Peter Hammond. Five episodes were produced. Unlike most shows by Associated-Rediffusion, the series survives intact.

References

External links
Something in the City at IMDb

ITV sitcoms
1959 British television series debuts
1959 British television series endings
1950s British sitcoms
Black-and-white British television shows
English-language television shows